This is a list of Romania's richest people (Romanian: cei mai bogați români) for the year 2016. The list is published yearly by the newspaper Capital. The full list is published as a book and only the top 10 are published online.

References

External links
2013 toplist

Romanian businesspeople